The British Rail Class 365 Networker Express were dual-voltage ( and 750 V DC) electric multiple-unit passenger trains built by ABB at Holgate Road Carriage Works in 1994 and 1995 to operate services in South East England and on the Great Northern Route. These were the last trains to be built at the Holgate Road works before its closure. Due to the refurbished front end resembling a smiling face, the trains were nicknamed "Happy Trains" by enthusiasts.

Background
In the early 1990s, the Networker family was entering large-scale service in the Network SouthEast sector – both third-rail 'Networker' EMUs (/) and 'Network Turbo' DMUs (/) were in service, with proposals for others, including a so-called "Universal Networker", intended as Classes 371 and 381, that would have dual-voltage capability. However, by 1992, no work had been done in the development of these due to a lack of funding, so a replacement plan was required. For this, the Class 465 was modified for longer-distance services – a prototype was converted from an existing unit (designated as Class 465/3) to determine suitability, before funding was authorised for the purchase of 41 dual-voltage EMUs, each of four cars. These became the Class 365.

Network SouthEast won an argument for government investment for the trains, over InterCity's proposal for InterCity 250. The Class 365 was ordered in 1993.

Description
Although specified as a dual-voltage unit, Class 365s never operated with this capability since they were built with only one system of traction current pickup.

The first 16 (365501 to 365516), which worked briefly for Network SouthEast before the South Eastern franchise was awarded to Connex South Eastern, were originally supplied only with DC shoe gear for use on the 750 V third-rail system. During testing and commissioning, 365502 ran briefly on the AC network, this being the main reason for the unit being chosen to be subleased to WAGN in the aftermath of the Potters Bar accident in 2002.

When they transferred to West Anglia Great Northern for use with  overhead line traction supply, the shoes and associated equipment were removed and a Brecknell Willis high speed pantograph was installed, along with other operator and voltage-specific modifications and testing by Bombardier Transportation at its Doncaster Works.

However, the 365s retained the original 750 V DC bus, meaning that when on  overhead lines the current is collected as AC, rectified to DC for the onboard systems, and then inverted back to AC for the 3-phase traction motors.

Basic equipment consisted of:
DMOC A – 4x Three-phase AC traction motors, traction inverter, sander
TOSL – Compressor, auxiliary converter, universal access toilet
PTOSL – Pantograph, transformer, auxiliary converter, small toilet
DMOC B – 4x Three-phase AC traction motors, traction inverter, sander

Dynamic (rheostatic) braking on the two Driving Motor coaches was available in addition to disc brakes, via a system of brake blending.

In common with the whole Networker fleet, wheel slide protection (WSP) operated on every axle. Under braking conditions a blowdown valve released air from the brake cylinder of any axle if the rotational speed varies significantly from the average axle speed on the train.

Internal LED Passenger Information Display Systems and Auto-Announcers were fitted across the fleet.

Ownership
In the lead up to the privatisation of British Rail, responsibility for the Class 365s passed to Eversholt Rail Group. However, because the British Railways Board had leased rather than purchased the Class 365s, under a clause in the original procurement contract, ownership of the remaining 40 sets passed to the Department for Transport subsidiary Train Fleet (2019) Limited in July 2019 after it was obliged to pay out the leases to the Royal Bank of Scotland in the event that the trains were not wanted. In July 2021, all were sold back to Eversholt after termination of their leases with Govia Thameslink Railway was agreed.

Operations

South Eastern

The first 16 units were fitted for use on the 750 V DC lines. The first was delivered in November 1994, with testing commencing on 15 June 1995. Their first use in service occurred on 13 October 1996, but due to problems in obtaining a safety case, they did not enter full service with Connex South Eastern until 16 June 1997. Before it entered service, 365513 was damaged in a shunting incident at Chart Leacon TMD and was forwarded to Doncaster Works in November 1996.

From August 2002 until January 2003, 365502 was sublet to WAGN to provide cover after 365526 was involved in the Potters Bar accident. All passed with the franchise to South Eastern Trains in November 2003. All were transferred to West Anglia Great Northern in 2004.

Great Northern

Twenty-five Class 365s (365517 to 365541) were delivered to Hornsey TMD to operate services on the East Coast Main Line from London King's Cross to Peterborough and King's Lynn. The first entered service with Network SouthEast on 9 December 1996. All were included in the transfer of the franchise to West Anglia Great Northern in January 1997. The last was delivered in July 1998.

As part of a project to fit driver's cab air-conditioning, all received new fronts in 2001/02. In May 2002, 365526 was involved in the Potters Bar accident and was subsequently written off. From August 2002 until January 2003, 365502 was sublet from Connex South Eastern to provide cover. In 2004, all 16 of Connex South Eastern examples (365501 to 365516) were transferred to West Anglia Great Northern to release Class 317s for use by Thameslink.

The remaining 40 sets passed with the franchise to First Capital Connect in April 2006. A refurbishment program at Ilford EMU Depot commenced in January 2014. All passed with the Thameslink, Southern & Great Northern franchise to Govia Thameslink Railway in September 2014.

In 2017, the Class 365 fleet were relegated to peak-hour services after Class 387s and 700s entered service. It was proposed that some would be transferred to Great Western Railway to operate services on the Great Western Main Line from London Paddington to Newbury and Oxford, but this was aborted with new Class 387s purchased instead.

Great Northern retained 21 sets to operate limited stop peak-time services between London King's Cross-Peterborough and London King's Cross-. The remaining sets were placed in store in Ely.

In June 2018, ten were transferred to Abellio ScotRail to operate services from Edinburgh to Glasgow and Stirling. The other nine moved from Ely to King's Heath TMD, Northampton for further storage before moving to Crewe in September 2018.

In March 2021, it was announced that Great Northern would be withdrawing the remaining Class 365s from service in May 2021, in favour of Class 387s transferred from Gatwick Express.

The last day of service for the 365s on Great Northern was on 15 May 2021.

ScotRail

In April 2018 ten Class 365s (509, 513, 517, 519, 521, 523, 525, 529, 533 and 537) were leased to Abellio ScotRail in response to a rolling stock shortage which was caused by the delayed entry to service of the new Class 385s and the imminent transfer of a number of DMUs to Arriva Rail North. They entered service on 23 June 2018 on Glasgow to Edinburgh and Stirling services after modifications and driver training. The ScotRail units were withdrawn in March 2019 and moved to Crewe where they were kept in warm store by Rail Operations Group.

Accidents and incidents
 365526 – DMOC B and PTOSL were damaged in the Potters Bar rail accident in 2002. After being stored at Crewe Works and later Wolverton Works until the Rail Accident Investigation Branch had completed its investigations, two carriages were used for target practice at RAF Spadeadam, while one was taken to Ilford EMU Depot for stripping of spare parts.
 365531 – DMOC A was damaged in a fatal collision with a tractor at Black Horse Drove crossing in October 2005.
 365532 – DMOC A was damaged in a collision with a tractor at Hatson's User-Worked Crossing in September 2011.
365512 – DMOC B was damaged in a fatal collision with a car at Pleasants crossing in July 2012.
 A Class 365 unit collided at low speed with another it was due to couple onto at Cambridge station on 30 May 2015. Three passengers sustained slight injuries.
 365520 – DMOC B was damaged in a collision with a Land Rover at Nairns User-Worked Crossing in August 2016.

Fleet details

Naming

Some were named. 365505 and 365515 were named by Connex South Eastern, and were subsequently removed. Vinyl nameplates with a pink backing were applied to the driving vehicles, behind the cab doors, by First Capital Connect. Following a repaint into Great Northern colours most were removed, but several were reapplied in the same style but with a light blue backing.

 365505 – Spirit of Ramsgate
 365506 – The Royston Express
365510 – Cambridge and Ely
 365513 – Hornsey Depot
 365514 – Captain George Vancouver
 365515 – Spirit of Dover
 365517 – Supporting Red Balloon
 365518 – The Fenman
 365519 – Peterborough - Environment City Later renamed to Discover Peterborough
 365521 – Steven
 365527 – Passengers' Champion
 365530 – The Interlink Partnership
 365531 – Nelson's County - Norfolk Later renamed to Norfolk - Nelson's County
 365533 – Max Appeal
 365536 – Rufus Barnes – Chief Executive of London TravelWatch for 25 years
 365537 – Daniel Edwards (1974–2010) Cambridge Driver
365540 – Garden Cities of Hertfordshire

Preservation
DMSO(A) 65917 and TSO 72287 from unit 365524 along with DMSO(B) 65974 from unit 365540 are to be put on static display at the East Kent Railway, where they will be used as a restaurant, an exhibition area, and a major events venue.

References

External links

365
Train-related introductions in 1996
750 V DC multiple units
25 kV AC multiple units
ABB multiple units